The 2021–22 Southend United F.C. season is the club's 116th season in their history and the first season in the National League following their second successive relegation. Along with the National League, the club will also participate in the FA Cup and FA Trophy.

The season saw a change in manager and first team coaches following the sacking of Phil Brown. Kevin Maher was recruited as first team coach, as well as multiple notable backroom-staff appointments, including former player, Stan Collymore as Senior Football Strategist and John Still as Head of Football.

The season covers the period from 1 July 2021 to 30 June 2022.

Players

Squad

Transfers

Transfers in

Loans in

Transfers out

Loans out

Competitions

National League

League table

Results summary

Results by matchday

Matches
The 2021–22 National League fixtures were announced on 7 July 2021.

FA Cup

Southend entered the FA Cup at the Fourth Qualifying Round.

FA Trophy

Southend entered the FA Trophy at the Third Round

References

Southend United
Southend United F.C. seasons